Škarnice is a settlement in the Municipality of Dobje in eastern Slovenia. The municipality was traditionally part of Styria. It is now included in the Savinja Statistical Region.

References

External links
Škarnice on Geopedia

Populated places in the Municipality of Dobje